The 2016 United States House of Representatives elections in Oklahoma occurred on November 8, 2016. Voters determined five candidates to serve in the U.S. House, one from each of the state's five congressional districts. The primaries were held on June 28.

Results summary

Statewide

District

District 1

The 1st district is located in the Tulsa metropolitan area and includes Creek, Rogers, Tulsa, Wagoner and Washington counties. The incumbent is Republican Jim Bridenstine, who has represented the district since 2013. He ran unopposed in 2014. The district has a PVI of R+18.

Republican primary

Candidates

Declared
 Tom Atkinson
 Jim Bridenstine, incumbent U.S. Representative
 Evelyn Rogers

Results

Independent candidates

Candidates

Withdrawn
David Matthew Hullum, Independent candidate

General election

Results
Bridenstine ran unopposed for re-election.

District 2

The 2nd district is located in Green Country and Kiamichi Country and includes the city of Muskogee and numerous sparsely populated counties. The incumbent is Republican Markwayne Mullin, who has represented the district since 2013. He was elected with 70% of the vote in 2014. The district has a PVI of R+20.

Republican primary

Candidates

Declared
 Jarrin Jackson
 Markwayne Mullin, incumbent U.S. Representative

Results

Democratic primary

Candidates

Declared
 Joshua Harris-Till, the Democratic nominee for the seat in 2014.
 Paul Schiefelbein

Results

Independent candidates

Candidates

Declared
Independent candidate John McCarthy also ran.

General election

Results

District 3

The 3rd district is located in Western Oklahoma. The largest district in Oklahoma and one of the largest in the country, it includes the Oklahoma Panhandle, Ponca City and the city of Stillwater as well as the Osage Nation. The incumbent is Republican Frank Lucas, who has represented the district since 2003 and previously represented the 6th district from 1994 to 2003. He was re-elected with 78% of the vote in 2014 and the district has a PVI of R+26.

Republican Frank Lucas ran unopposed in the Republican primary. Democrat Frankie Robbins, an engineer and United States Forest Service employee who was a candidate for the seat in 2014 and the nominee for the seat in 2008, 2010 and 2012 is the only other candidate running.

Republican primary

Candidates

Declared
 Desiree Brown
 Frank Lucas, incumbent U.S. Representative

Results

General election

Results

District 4

The 4th district is located in South Central Oklahoma and includes Canadian, Comanche and Cleveland counties as well as numerous other sparsely populated counties. The incumbent is Republican Tom Cole, who has represented the district since 2003. He was re-elected with 70% of the vote in 2014 and the district has a PVI of R+19.

Republican primary

Candidates

Declared
 Tom Cole ran unopposed in the Republican primary.
 Bert Smith, the Democratic nominee for the seat in 2014.

Results

Democratic primary

Candidates

Declared
 Christina Owen
 Bert Smith, the Democratic nominee for the seat in 2014.

Results

General election

Results

District 5

The 5th district is located in Central Oklahoma and includes Oklahoma, Pottawatomie and Seminole counties. The incumbent in 2016 was Republican Steve Russell, who had represented the district since 2014. He was elected with 60% of the vote in 2014 after having defeated five Republican candidates in the primary and Republican Patrice Douglas again in the Republican primary runoff with 59% of the vote. The district had a PVI of R+12.

Republican primary

Candidates

Declared
 Steve Russell
 Frank Volpe

Results

Democratic primary

Candidates

Declared
 Tom Guild, University of Central Oklahoma professor and nominee for the seat in 2010, 2012 and 2014
 Leona Leonard, Chairman of the Seminole County Democratic Party, ran previously for this seat in 2014.
 Al McAffrey, State Senator, ran previously for this seat in 2014.

Results

Runoff results

Libertarian candidates

Candidates

Declared
 Zachary Knight

General election

Results

See also

 2016 United States Senate election in Oklahoma
 2016 United States House of Representatives elections

References

United States House of Representatives
Oklahoma
2016